The Baltimore Elite Giants were a professional baseball team that played in the Negro leagues from  to . The team was established by Thomas T. Wilson, in Nashville, Tennessee as the semi-pro Nashville Standard Giants on March 26, 1920. The team and its fans pronounced the word "Elite" as "ee-light".

Barnstorming years 
The Nashville Standard Giants were formed as a semi-professional all-Negro team in Nashville, Tennessee, on March 26, 1920. The club was chartered by Thomas T. Wilson, T. Clay Moore, J. B. Boyd, Marshall Garrett, Walter Phillips, W. H. Pettis, J. L. Overton, and R. H. Tabor. The team's origins lie in that of two of Nashville's local negro amateur baseball teams: the Nashville Maroons (formed in 1909) and the Elites (formed in 1913). Their home games were played at Sulphur Dell and Greenwood Park, the African American community's local park. The Standard Giants welcomed any and all competition, including white-only teams, but played independently of any organized leagues until the mid-1920s.

The team was renamed the Nashville Elite Giants (pronounced EE-light) in 1921.  That same year, they swept the Montgomery Grey Sox (of the minor league Negro Southern League) in a four-game championship series to win the right to declare themselves the Southern Colored Champions. They continued to play independently until joining the Negro Southern League in 1926. Nashville completed its first season in the league with a 15–15 (.500) record.

In 1929, Nashville was granted an associate membership in the Negro National League. The team finished in eighth (last) place with a 10–20 (.333) record. That same year, Wilson built a new ballpark for his team, Tom Wilson Park, which also served as a spring training site for other Negro league teams, as well as white-only minor league teams, such as the Southern Association's Nashville Vols. Babe Ruth, Lou Gehrig, and Roy Campanella are known to have played at the park. The 8,000 (or 4,000) seat facility featured a single-decked, covered grandstand. The ballpark was centrally located in Nashville's largest black community, known as Trimble Bottom, near the convergence of Second and Forth Avenues, just north of the fairgrounds.

Negro league years

National League 

In , the team gained admission into their first organized league, the Negro National League. The Elite Giants finished in seventh place with a 39–47 record.

The following season, Wilson moved the team to Cleveland, Ohio and renamed the team the Cleveland Cubs, remaining in the same league. The team finished in seventh place with a 25–28 record.

Southern League 

Second National League 

Nashville finished the 1933 season in fifth place with a 29–22 record and tied as winners of the second half of the season with the Pittsburgh Crawfords. Nashville lost a three-game playoff with Pittsburgh for a spot in the league championship game. In , the Elite Giants finished in fourth place with a 20–28 record.

In , the team moved to Columbus, Ohio and became the Columbus Elite Giants. They played only one season in Columbus, 1935, finishing in fourth place with a 16–17 record.

In  the team moved to Washington, D.C. and became the Washington Elite Giants. In their first season, they finished in fifth place with a 21–24 record. In , the Elites finished in third place with a 27–17 record.

In , the Elites won the Negro National Title, defeating the Homestead Grays. In , they won the first half, but lost the championship to second half winners, the Homestead Grays.

American League 

In , the Negro National League ceased operations, and the Elite Giants joined the Negro American League. In their first season with the new league, Baltimore captured the Eastern and Western Division titles, earning them a second Negro National Title. In thirteen seasons in Baltimore, of the eleven which have available standings, the Elite Giants finished in the top three during nine of those seasons. In dire financial straits, the club played one final season in  before dissolving.

Baseball Hall of Fame inductees
These Baltimore Elite Giants alumni have been inducted to the National Baseball Hall of Fame and Museum.

A number of future major leaguers wore the uniform of the Elite Giants, including Hall of Famers Roy Campanella and Leon Day (who played in with the team in the non-major league years of 1949-50). Also a member of the Elite Giants were two future National League Rookie of the Years in Junior Gilliam (1953) and Joe Black (1952), each who played with Campanella for the Brooklyn Dodgers.

Championships
{| border="0" style="width:100%;"
|-
| valign="top" |

References
Nipper, Skip. Baseball in Nashville. Charleston, SC: Arcadia Publishing, 2007. 
"Baltimore Elite Giants." Negro League Baseball Players Association. 2007. 28 December 2007.

External links
 Franchise history at Seamheads.com

African-American history in Baltimore
Negro league baseball teams
Amateur baseball teams in Tennessee
Washington Elite Giants
Professional baseball teams in Maryland
Professional baseball teams in Ohio
Professional baseball teams in Tennessee
Sports in Nashville, Tennessee
Sports teams in Columbus, Ohio
Washington Elite Giants
Sports teams in Baltimore
Baseball teams established in 1920
Baseball teams disestablished in 1950
1920 establishments in Tennessee
1950 disestablishments in Maryland
Defunct baseball teams in Maryland